Memecylon tirunelvelicum is a plant species endemic to the Tinurelveli Hills in Tamil Nadu, India. It is known from only 3 localities in the Western Ghat Mountains, at elevations of 900–1100 m.

Memecylon tirunelvelicum is a tree up to 4 m tall. Leaves are opposite, ovate to lanceolate, pointed at the tip, up to 9 cm long. Flowers are blue, about 1 cm in diameter.

References

Flora of Tamil Nadu
Endemic flora of India (region)
tirunelvelicum